
The Kizomba deepwater project is an oil drilling project owned and operated by ExxonMobil off the coast of northern Angola. It is named after the Kizomba Angolan dance.

Kizomba A
The Kizomba A project utilizes the Hungo and Chocalho oil fields, in the so-called Block 15 concession off the Angolan coast. The project consists of a TLP and an FPSO, which receives oil from the wells to be stored until transfer to tankers.

Built at a cost of over US$800 million by Hyundai Heavy Industries in Ulsan, Korea, it is operated by ExxonMobil.

Kizomba B

Kizomba C
It was launched in 2008 through 2 FPSOs respectively named Saxi/Batuque and Mondo with a 100,000 bpd production capacity.

References

External links

Kizomba map
 http://www.offshoreenergytoday.com/exxonmobil-orders-umbilicals-for-kizomba-project-offshore-angola/

Oil fields of Angola
ExxonMobil oil and gas fields